South Thuringia refers to all the Franconia regions in the German Free State of Thuringia south of the Rennsteig and the Salzbogen, but including the entire former county of Bad Salzungen. The region is, if the Eisenach area is excluded, almost identical with the Southwest Thuringian Planning Region (Planungsregion Südwestthüringen) in the state of Thuringia.

The Rennsteig is a historical border road, that marked the boundary between the Duchy of Franconia and the Thuringian-Saxon sovereign territory, and today still represents the language boundary between the Main-Franconian dialects and the Thuringian-Upper Saxon language area of Thuringia.

Literature

References

External links 
 Bilder aus Südthüringen auf Thüringer-Landschaften.de
 Info-Portal der Region Südthüringen
 Naturräumliche Gliederung Thüringens (pdf; 1,5 MB)
 Handwerkskammer Südthüringen
 Industrie- und Handelskammer Südthüringen
 Suhler Verlagsgruppe
 Pro fränkische Initiative in Südthüringen

 
Regions of Thuringia
Thuringian Franconia